Van Hooijdonk or van Hooydonk is a Dutch toponymic surname Hooijdonk/Hooydonk is an archaic spelling of "Hooidonk", a village between Nuenen and Son, North Brabant. Notable people with the surname include:

 Adrian van Hooydonk (born 1964), Dutch automobile designer
 Jeffrey van Hooydonk (born 1977), Belgian racing driver
 Pierre van Hooijdonk (born 1969), Dutch footballer

Dutch-language surnames
Surnames of Dutch origin